Peter Andrew Funaki is a Niuean politician who serves in the Niue Assembly, representing the Tamakautoga constituency. Funaki also serves in the cabinet of Premier Toke Talagi as a member that assists the Minister of the Ministry of Infrastructure, Pokotoa Sipeli.

He lost his seat in the 2020 Niuean general election.

References

Year of birth missing (living people)
Living people
Members of the Niue Assembly